Kashless.org was a Seattle, Washington-based web marketplace where everything was free.
Kashless provided a platform to find and redistribute any used or unwanted items, with the goal of reducing users' carbon footprint by consuming less. Another goal was to reduce the amount of matter going to landfills. Initially launched in the Puget Sound area of Washington in February 2009, Kashless was offered to many local communities in over 40 states and territories of the United States.

Overview
Kashless.org was founded in October 2008 by ex-Microsoft IT expert Martin Tobias. Developed by Kashless, Inc., Kashless.org was a non-profit demonstration of their software to enable reuse marketplaces.

Kashless not only gave its users the ability to get rid of or receive any free, reused, and unwanted items – it also awarded them with points for doing so. Kashless.org partnered with rewards company RecycleBank in this effort, allocating points to users for both posted and wanted items, along with other point accumulation options. Reward points could then be redeemed through partner RecycleBank’s Web site. Kashless suspended its RecycleBank's points program in early 2010. As of early 2011 it shut down because of lack of funding, referring visitors to Craigslist and freecycle.org.

References

External links
 Give It Away Now: Kashless.org to Expand Nationwide
 Kashless.org Debuts Free Private Label 'ReCommerce' Service for Businesses, Community Groups and Charitable Organizations (PR Web)
 Recycle Bank: Tons of New Points Via Kashless
 Thumbs Up to Kashless and RecycleBank

Recycling organizations
Defunct companies based in Seattle